Elmbrook Farm is a historic farm complex located at Schodack in Rensselaer County, New York. The farmhouse itself was built about 1830 and modified about twenty years later to include Greek Revival architecture. The complex also includes a barn (ca. 1790), a shop / office (ca. 1800), a milk shed, a corn crib, a cinder block garage, and a small family burial plot.

It was listed on the National Register of Historic Places in 2001.

References

Farms on the National Register of Historic Places in New York (state)
Greek Revival houses in New York (state)
Houses completed in 1830
Houses in Rensselaer County, New York
1830 establishments in New York (state)
National Register of Historic Places in Rensselaer County, New York